Crystal Anne Dickinson is an American actress. She made her Broadway debut in the play Clybourne Park written by Bruce Norris and directed by Pam MacKinnon.

Early life and education 
Crystal Dickinson was born in New Jersey. She graduated from Seton Hall University in 1998 in the College of Communication and the Arts. She also received an MFA from the University of Illinois at Champaign-Urbana and studied at the London Academy of Music and Dramatic Art.

Career
Dickinson is best known for her role on the Showtime series The CHI as Detective Toussaint. She has also appeared in other TV series such as New Amsterdam, Feed the Beast,  House of Payne and The Good Wife and the films I-Origins and This is Where I Leave You.

She made her Broadway debut in Bruce Norris' Clybourne Park and has since returned to Broadway appearing alongside James Earl Jones in You Can't Take It With You.

A recipient of Theatre World Award in 2012 for Clybourne Park, she has also won a Jenny Award for Best Actress. She was nominated for the AUDELCO in 2009, 2010, 2011 and 2013.

Personal life
Dickinson is married to actor Brandon J. Dirden. They have one son, Chase Ari Dirden, born March 29, 2014.

Filmography

Television

Film

References

External links
Instagram @cryssielovelove

American television actresses
American film actresses
Living people
University of Illinois Urbana-Champaign alumni
Year of birth missing (living people)
Place of birth missing (living people)
American stage actresses
Theatre World Award winners
21st-century American women